Upper Nappan is a community in the Canadian province of Nova Scotia, located in  Cumberland County.

Notable people
Roger Stuart Bacon, politician and dairy farmer

References

References
 Upper Nappan on Destination Nova Scotia

Communities in Cumberland County, Nova Scotia
General Service Areas in Nova Scotia